Nebularia deynzeri is a species of sea snail, a marine gastropod mollusc in the family Mitridae, the miters or miter snails.

Description
.

Distribution
This marine species occurs off Okinawa Island

References

 Cernohorsky W.O. (1980). The taxonomy of some Indo-Pacific Mollusca part 8. Records of the Auckland Institute and Museum. 17: 135-152.
 Poppe G.T., Tagaro S. & Salisbury R. (2009) New species of Mitridae and Costellariidae from the Philippines. Visaya Suppl. 4: 1-86
 Huang, S.-I. (2021). A new genus Acromargarita n. gen. and four new Mitridae from the Indo-Pacific Ocean (Mollusca: Gastropoda). Visaya. 5(5): 79-94.

deynzeri
Gastropods described in 1980